Thirumayam block is a revenue block in Pudukkottai district, Tamil Nadu, India. It has a total of 33 panchayat villages.

Villages of Thirumayam block
1.	Adhanoor  
2.	Aranginapatti  
3.	Arasampatti  
4.	Athoor, Pudukkottai  
5.	Ilanjavur  
6.	K.pallivasal  
7.	Kannanur  
8.	Konapet  
9.	Kottaiyur, Pudukkottai  
10.	Kottur, Pudukkottai  
11.	Kulamangalam, Pudukkottai  
12.	Kulipirai  
13.	Kuruvikondanpatti  
14.	Lembalakuudi  
15.	Melapanaiyur  
16.	Melur, Pudukkottai  
17.	Mithilaipatti  
18.	Nachandupatti  
19.	Neikonam  
20.	Neivasal  
21.	Oonaiyur  
22.	P.azhagapuri  
23.     Pillamanganlam  
24.	Panaiyapatti  
25.	Peraiyur, Pudukkottai  
26.	Pilivalam  
27.	Rangiyam, Pudukkottai  
28.	Rarapuram  
29.	Sethurapatti  
30.	Thirumayam  
31.	Thulaiyanur  
32.	V.lakshmipuram  
33.	Vengalur  
34.	Viratchilai

References 

 

Revenue blocks of Pudukkottai district